Lorle Herdey-von Savageri (28 October 1923 – 1 October 2008) was an Austrian architect. Her work was part of the architecture event in the art competition at the 1948 Summer Olympics.

References

1923 births
2008 deaths
20th-century Austrian architects
Austrian women architects
Olympic competitors in art competitions
Architects from Graz